Anammelech ( ʿAnammelekh), according to the Hebrew Bible, was a Syrian and Mesopotamian goddess worshipped alongside Adrammelech. She is a lunar deity and is said to have been worshipped at Sepharvaim, an Assyrian town. She is possibly the daughter of Anu as her name means "Anu is king."

References

Deities in the Hebrew Bible